The 1953 Pan Arab Games football tournament was the 1st edition of the Pan Arab Games men's football tournament. The football tournament was held in Alexandria, the Egypt between 1–9 August 1953 as part of the 1953 Pan Arab Games.

Participating teams
The following countries have participated for the final tournament:

Squads

Group stage

Group A

Group B

Knockout stage

Fifth place match

Third place match

Final

Final ranking

External links
1st Pan Arab Games, 1953 (Alexandria, Egypt) - rsssf.com

1953 Pan Arab Games
1953
Pan
Pan
1953